The Men's ski halfpipe competition at the FIS Freestyle Ski and Snowboarding World Championships 2021 was held on 12 March. A qualification will be held on 10 March 2021.

Qualification
The qualification was started on 10 March at 09:50. The best ten skiers qualified for the final.

Final
The final was started at 13:00.

References

Men's ski halfpipe